Primo Zamparini (born 9 February 1939) is a retired Italian bantamweight boxer who won a silver medal at the 1960 Olympics. After winning a European bronze in 1961 he turned professional, and had a record of 16 wins (7 by knockout), 6 losses and 6 draws. He retired in 1966.

Amateur career

Highlights
European Championships (54 kg), Luzern, Switzerland, May 1959:
1/16: Bye
1/8: Defeated Paavo Roininen (Finland) by decision
1/4: Lost to Oleg Grigoryev (Soviet Union) by unanimous decision, 0–5
 World Military Championships (54 kg), Wiesbaden, West Germany, June 1960:
Finals: (no data available)
 XVII Summer Olympics (54 kg), Rome, Italy, August-September 1960:
1/32: Bye
1/16: Defeated Panagiotis Kostarellos (Greece) by unanimous decision, 5–0
1/8: Defeated Katsuo Haga (Japan) by unanimous decision, 5–0
1/4: Defeated Jerry Armstrong (United States) by majority decision, 4–1
1/2: Defeated Oliver Taylor (Australia) by unanimous decision, 5–0
Finals: Lost to Oleg Grigoryev (Soviet Union) by split decision, 1–3–1
 European Championships (54 kg), Belgrade, Yugoslavia, June 1961:
1/8: Defeated Miodrag Mitrović (Yugoslavia) by decision
1/4: Defeated Gyula Török (Hungary) by decision
1/2: Lost to Sergey Sivko (Soviet Union) by decision

Professional career

Professional boxing record

References

External links
 (history)

1939 births
Living people
People from Fabriano
Olympic boxers of Italy
Bantamweight boxers
Olympic silver medalists for Italy
Boxers at the 1960 Summer Olympics
Olympic medalists in boxing
Italian male boxers
Medalists at the 1960 Summer Olympics
Sportspeople from the Province of Ancona